Corunastylis densa, commonly known as the dense midge orchid, is a small terrestrial orchid endemic to eastern Australia. It has a single thin leaf fused to the flowering stem and up to twenty five densely crowded reddish-brown to dark purplish-brown flowers. It is found between the New England National Park and the Moroka River.

Description
As with others in the genus, the flowers are inverted so that the labellum is above the column rather than below it. There is a callus in the centre of the labellum and extending nearly to its tip. Flowering occurs from December to February.

Taxonomy and naming
The dense midge orchid was first formally described in 1885 by Robert D. FitzGerald who gave it the name Prasophyllum  densum and published the description in Journal of Botany, British and Foreign. In 2005, David Jones and Mark Clements changed the name to Corunastylis densa. The specific epithet (densa) is a Latin word meaning "thick" or "close".

The World Checklist of Selected Plant Families lists C. densa as a synonym of Genoplesium nudiscapum.

Distribution and habitat
Corunastylis densa grows in a range of habitats between Point Lookout in New South Wales and the Moroka River in Victoria but is absent from the Snowy Mountains and the Australian Capital Territory.

References

External links
 

densa
Endemic orchids of Australia
Orchids of New South Wales
Plants described in 1885